The WWC Universal Heavyweight Championship is a professional wrestling championship owned by the World Wrestling Council (WWC) promotion. Locally, it is exclusively defended in WWC, but has made several appearances in foreign promotions during international tours. Being a professional wrestling championship, it is won via a scripted ending to a match or awarded to a wrestler because of a storyline. All but two of the title changes have occurred at WWC-promoted events, with the exceptions taking place at events hosted by International Championship Wrestling (ICW) and the International Wrestling Association (IWA). Title changes that occur on WWC's television program Súperestrellas de la Lucha Libre usually air on tape delay and as such are listed with the day the tapings occurred, rather than the air date.

The title was introduced as a plot device to promote the return of Abdullah the Butcher on July 21, 1982, and was originally named the "Capitol Sports Promotions (CSP) World Heavyweight Championship". Within a year, the title was renamed "CSP Universal Heavyweight Championship" following a storyline where titlist Carlos Colón defeated NWA World Heavyweight Champion Ric Flair in a match to determine which title had supremacy. When CSP reorganized and adopted the name of WWC, the championship's acronym was changed along it. It has remained under this name ever since, but due to copyright concerns it was briefly renamed "Capitol Heavyweight Championship" when the IWA gained possession of the belt on January 6, 2008.

The inaugural champion was Abdullah the Butcher. Carlos Colón, Sr. has held the title the most, with 26 reigns. The longest reign in the title history is Colón, Sr.'s second reign at  days. Carly Colón's 11th and the only reigns of Vampiro and Lance Hoyt are tied for the record of shortest reign in the title's history, lasting less than one day. Carlos Colón holds the record for combined days as champion, with 3,945. Overall, there have been 147 reigns shared among 49 wrestlers, not including one expunged reign and one unofficial title change, with 35 vacancies totaling 1,010 Days.

Title history

Reigns

 
|}

Combined reigns

Footnotes
A. Each wrestler's total number of days as champion is ranked highest to lowest; wrestlers with the same number are tied for that certain rank.

References
General

Specific

External links

Heavyweight Champions
Professional wrestling champion lists